The Country Cousin is a 1919 American silent drama film directed by Alan Crosland and starring Elaine Hammerstein, Genevieve Tobin and Lumsden Hare.

Cast
 Elaine Hammerstein as Nancy Price 
 Margaret Seddon as Mrs. Howitt 
 Lumsden Hare as Archie Gore 
 Genevieve Tobin as Eleanor Howitt 
 Reginald Sheffield as Sammy Wilson 
 Walter McGrail as George Tewksbury Reynolds III 
 Bigelow Cooper as Mr. Howitt 
 Helen Montrose as Maude Howitt 
 Gilbert Rooney as Cyril Kinney

References

Bibliography
 Goble, Alan. The Complete Index to Literary Sources in Film. Walter de Gruyter, 1999.

External links

1919 films
1919 drama films
Silent American drama films
Films directed by Alan Crosland
American silent feature films
1910s English-language films
American black-and-white films
Selznick Pictures films
1910s American films